Pseudomegalonychus is a genus of ground beetles in the family Carabidae. There are at least three described species in Pseudomegalonychus, found in Africa.

Species
These three species belong to the genus Pseudomegalonychus:
 Pseudomegalonychus debeckeri Basilewsky, 1976  (Tanzania)
 Pseudomegalonychus ferrugineus Basilewsky, 1956  (Burundi and Rwanda)
 Pseudomegalonychus uyttenboogaarti (Basilewsky, 1948)  (South Africa)

References

Platyninae